Fat fetishism or adipophilia (Latin "adipem" - "fat" and Greek "φιλία" - "love") is a sexual attraction directed towards overweight or obese people due primarily to their weight and size.

A variety of fat fetishism is feed(er)ism or gaining, where sexual gratification is obtained  from the process of gaining, or helping others gain, body fat, not from the fat itself. Fat fetishism also incorporates stuffing and padding, whereas the focus of arousal is on the sensations and properties of a real or simulated gain.

As a subculture

The fat fetishism community has overlapped with body positivity and fat feminism movements. The National Association to Advance Fat Acceptance (NAAFA) has worked as an advocacy organization for fat people, but was partly formed to help male fat fetishists and other fat admirers (FAs) find fat women to date and have sex with.

Fat fetishism as a community is predominantly heterosexual, focusing on fat women and thinner men. Fat fetishism includes both real-life and internet communities. Fat fetishism practices and subcultures include internet porn; "gaining" and "feeding", which involves eating to intentionally gain weight; "hogging", which is when men seek out fat women to sexually exploit; and "squashing" which is sexual attraction to the idea of being crushed by a fat person or people.

According to The Routledge Companion to Beauty Politics, "the gendered, raced, and classed power dynamics of many of these subcultures often mirror, reinforce, and even exaggerate existing racial, gender, class, and sexual inequalities." Sociologist Abigail C. Saguy has proposed that by objectifying women's weight, they are reinforcing the cultural importance of women's weight to their physical appearance, therefore also reinforcing gender inequality.

Feedism
Gainers and feedees are people who enjoy the fantasy or reality of gaining weight themselves. Encouragers and feeders enjoy the fantasy of helping someone else gain weight. 'Gainer' and 'encourager' are common labels among gay men, while both straight men and women as well as lesbian women often identify as feeders and feedees. Some prefer the term "feedism" over feederism, as it suggests a more equal relationship between the feeder and feedee.

While gaining and feeding are often considered fetishes, many within the gainer and feedism communities report viewing them more as a lifestyle, identity or sexual orientation.

Feedism is portrayed by media as a taboo or a niche interest. Negative media portrayals include Feed, which is an example of non-consensual feedism. Research has shown that the overwhelming majority of feedism relationships are fully consensual and immobility is mostly kept as a fantasy for participants. 

The gay gainer community grew out of the Girth & Mirth movement in the '70s. By 1988 there were gainer-specific newsletters and in 1992, the first gainer event, called EncourageCon, was held in New Hope, Pennsylvania. In 1996, GainRWeb launched, the first website dedicated to gay men into weight gain.

See also
Bear (gay culture)
Big Beautiful Woman
Big Handsome Man
Chub (gay culture)
Fat acceptance movement
Leblouh
Obesity and sexuality

References

Sources
Giovanelli, Dina and Natalie Peluso.  2006.  "Feederism: a new sexual pleasure and subculture".  Pp 309–314 in The Handbook of New Sexuality Studies.  Edited by Steven Seidman.  Oxford, UK: Routledge.
Kathleen LeBesco. 2004. Revolting Bodies?: The Struggle to Redefine Fat Identity. Univ of Massachusetts Press. 
Don Kulick and Anne Meneley. 2005. Fat: The Anthropology of an Obsession. 
Charles, K and Palkowski, M. 2015. Feederism: Eating, Weight Gain and Sexual Pleasure, Palgrave

Further reading
 
 

 
Obesity
Paraphilias
Sexual fetishism
Sexology